Claremont railway station is a railway station on the Transperth network in Western Australia. It is located on the Fremantle and Airport lines, 9.3 kilometres from Perth station serving the suburb of Claremont.

History
Claremont station opened in 1881 as Butlers Swamp, being renamed Claremont in 1883. In 1886 a new station was constructed 300 metres to the east. The 1886 buildings are now the oldest extant railway station buildings in Perth. It was the only station on the line to be built with a crossing loop.

With the relocation of the Royal Perth Show to the Claremont Showground in 1905, a third platform was added with the station serving the show until Showgrounds station opened in 1954. The station closed on 1 September 1979 along with the rest of the Fremantle line, re-opening on 29 July 1983 when services were restored. The station building was restored at the same time. When the line was electrified in 1991, the station was cut back to one island platform and the original platform abandoned.

After the Town of Claremont's Council Chambers were gutted by fire in 2010, it relocated its administration to the former station master's building. The former goods shed has been converted into a cultural centre and cafe.

Redevelopment 
In 2018, an upgrade to rail facilities at Claremont station was announced by the Government of Western Australia. The project involved the construction of new train turnback facilities west of the station, allowing Airport line trains to turn around at Claremont. Also included in the project was future proofing for an extension of the platform to facilitate six-carriage trains, and the installation of an additional underpass to replace the western pedestrian level crossing. Works were completed in 2021. The Airport line began servicing the station on 10 October 2022.

Station location
Claremont station is located in the middle of Claremont. The railway's right-of-way lies between two arterial roads: Shenton Road and Gugeri Street. There are three access points to the station from each street. At the western and eastern ends of the island platform are grade level track crossings through electrically activated gates. In the centre of the platform the original pedestrian bridge provides access by stairs to the platform and to the elevated signal box.

Services
Claremont station is served by the Airport and Fremantle lines on the Transperth network. Services are operated by Transperth Train Operations, a division of the PTA. The Fremantle line runs between Fremantle station and Perth station, continuing past Perth as the Midland line. The Airport line, which commenced regular services on 10 October 2022, goes between High Wycombe station and Claremont station.

Airport line and Fremantle line trains stop at Claremont every 12 minutes each during peak hour for a combined frequency of a train every 6 minutes. Outside peak hour and on weekends and public holidays, each line has a train every 15 minutes for a combined frequency of 7.5 minutes. Late at night, each line has a half-hourly or hourly frequency.

Claremont station saw 579,729 passengers in the 2013–14 financial year.

Bus routes

References

Further reading
A History of Claremont Station Australian Railway Historical Society Bulletin issue 599 September 1987 pp. 195–216

External links

Claremont, Western Australia
Fremantle line
Listed railway stations in Australia
Railway stations in Perth, Western Australia
Railway stations in Australia opened in 1886
State Register of Heritage Places in the Town of Claremont
Railway stations in Australia opened in 1881
Airport line, Perth